The 27th Indiana Infantry Regiment was an infantry regiment that served in the Union Army during the American Civil War.

Service
The 27th Indiana Volunteer Infantry was organized at Indianapolis, Indiana, on September 12, 1861.
First Battle of Winchester
Battle of Front Royal
Battle of Cedar Mountain
Battle of Antietam
Battle of Chancellorsville
Battle of Gettysburg
New York Draft Riots
Battle of Resaca
Battle of Kennesaw Mountain
Siege of Atlanta
The regiment mustered out of service on November 4, 1864. Recruits and veterans were transferred to the 70th Indiana Infantry.
Roster List for all Indiana Regiments

Total strength and casualties
The regiment lost 10 officers and 159 enlisted men killed in action or died of wounds and 2 officers and 131 enlisted men who died of disease, for a total of 302 fatalities.

Commanders 

 Colonel Silas Colgrove
 Lieutenant Colonel Archibald T. Harrison - older brother of Benjamin Harrison, future President of the United States
 Lieutenant Colonel Abisha L. Morrison
 Lieutenant Colonel John Roush Fesler
 Major John Mehringer
 Major William S. Johnson
 Major George W. Burge
 Major Theodore F. Colgrove

See also

 List of Indiana Civil War regiments
 Indiana in the Civil War

Notes

References
The Civil War Archive - Indiana Units
Civil War - Indiana

Further reading
Giants in The Cornfield: The 27th Indiana Infantry
The Twenty-seventh Indiana volunteer infantry in the war of the rebellion, 1861 to 1865

Units and formations of the Union Army from Indiana
1861 establishments in Indiana
Military units and formations established in 1861
Military units and formations disestablished in 1864
1864 disestablishments in Indiana